is a railway station located about 15 kilometers from the center of Kyoto, near the Katsura River. The station provides transportation on the Hankyu Kyoto Line for the residents of Katsura, as well as a hub connecting to the communities along the Hankyu Arashiyama Line.

Layout
This station has three island platforms serving six tracks on the ground. Ticket gates are located over the platforms and tracks.

Station facilities 
Katsura Station features Hankyu Mew, a small 5-story shopping facility with clothing, book, 100 yen stores and restaurants such as KFC and Mos Burger.

Usage
In fiscal 2015 (April 2015 to March 2016), about 20,595,000 passengers used this station annually. For historical data, see the table below.

History 
Katsura Station opened on 1 November 1928.

Station numbering was introduced to all Hankyu stations on 21 December 2013 with this station being designated as station number HK-81.

Surrounding area 
Mister Donut, FamilyMart, 7-11, and Lawson are also located within walking distance. The station is also relatively near the Nishikyo Ward Office and Seiyu supermarket.

Adjacent stations

References

External links
Katsura Station from Hankyu Railway website

Hankyu Kyoto Main Line
Railway stations in Kyoto
Railway stations in Japan opened in 1928